C-type lectin domain family 5 member A (CLEC5A), also known as C-type lectin superfamily member 5 (CLECSF5) and myeloid DAP12-associating lectin 1 (MDL-1) is a C-type lectin that in humans is encoded by the CLEC5A gene. 

Structurally MDL-1 is a type II transmembrane protein with a short cytoplasmic tail and without signaling motifs, therefore it requires association with the adaptor protein DAP12 to generate signals via Syk pathway.

MDL-1 is highly expressed on myeloid lineages like neutrophil, monocyte, macrophage and also osteoclast, microglia and dendritic cells.

Activation of MDL-1 induces production of many cytokines (TNF-α, IL-1, IL-6, IL-8 and IL-17A) and chemokines (MIP-1α, RANTES, IP-10, MDC). MDL-1 also amplifies innate immune response.

Viral pathology
The most known ligand for CLEC5A is dengue virus (DV). Activated CLEC5A by binding to the dengue virion leads to phosphorylation of DAP12 and through Syk pathway are induced proinflammatory cytokines. CLEC5A is responsible for dengue virus induced hemorrhagic fever (DHF) and dengue shock syndrome (DSS), which is the most severe immune response to dengue virus infection and it is characterized by plasma leakage because of the increased vascular permeability. Interaction of CLEC5A and dengue virus also induces osteolytic activity.

Another pathogen is influenza virus and its hemagglutinin protein, which interacts with CLEC5A. Through this interaction is stimulated innate immune response and it leads to secretion of proinflammatory cytokines.

The researchers discovered that Japanese encephalitis virus (JEV) also binds to CLEC5A and contributes to viral pathology.

Use in therapy
With the discovery of CLEC5A interactions with different viruses, scientists are testing blocking anti-CLEC5A antibodies, Syk pathway inhibitors and CLEC5A deficient mice to discover CLEC5A contribution to pathological progress.

In the case of dengue virus, monoclonal anti-CLEC5A antibodies are able to suppress the secretion of proinflammatory cytokines without affecting IFN-α. Blockade of CLEC5A signaling in DV infected cells can attenuate vascular leakage and increase survival of patients with DHF and DSS.

In lethal challenges of recombinant H5N1 influenza virus, the CLEC5A deficient mice showed reduced levels of proinflammatory cytokines, decreased immune cell infiltration in the lungs and improved survival compared to the wild-type mice even with comparable viral loads.

For the Japanese encephalitis virus, blockade of CLEC5A cannot inhibit infection of neurons and astrocytes, however anti-CLEC5A decreases proinflammatory cytokines and toxic substances released from microglia.

References

Further reading

External links 
 

C-type lectins